The Third Circuit Court of Supreme People's Court of People's Republic of China opened on December 28, 2016, in Nanjing. It acts in the same authority as the Supreme People's Court and has jurisdiction in Jiangsu, Zhejiang, Fujian, Jiangxi, and Shanghai.

Judges

Facility and access
The court sits at 88 North Puzhu Rd, Pukou, Nanjing, Jiangsu 210031 (江苏省南京市浦口区浦珠北路88号). It is open to public from Monday to Thursday 08:30-11:30, 14:30-17:30. Appeal requests and trial files can be mailed to the same address.

See also 

 Supreme People's Court

References

External links 

 

Supreme People's Court
2016 establishments in China
Courts and tribunals established in 2016